The Departure is the 19th book in the Animorphs series, written by K.A. Applegate. It is narrated primarily by Cassie and secondarily by Jake, who narrates several chapters towards the end of the story.

Plot summary

The Animorphs attack the Hork-Bajir bodyguards at a Sharing meeting. The very second Jake ordered his team to break off, Cassie tore the throat out of a Hork-Bajir. Cassie, ridden with guilt, runs away. She senses someone watching her, but doesn't pay much attention. She demorphs, and has a nightmare (a scene from Megamorphs #2). She wakes up, and begins scrubbing her teeth and gums until they bleed as she had found a piece of Hork-Bajir flesh stuck in her teeth. The next day, Cassie meets the others at her barn. She explicitly declares that she's fed up with all the violence, and quits being an Animorph. The others are disgusted with her scrupulous behaviour, and brand her a hypocrite; Rachel in particular declares their friendship over, informing Cassie that she basically said the world can die so long as Cassie doesn't end up becoming as ruthless as Rachel. Marco makes a sarcastic remark about Cassie "going back to playing with her animals". Cassie then tells them that her father lost the much-needed funding to keep the rehabilitation clinic open. A distraught Cassie goes on a horse ride to calm her nerves.

Cassie suddenly spots a girl being chased by an angry bear. Cassie pursues them, but is knocked off her horse, and falls into the icy river. When she wakes up, she realizes she'd been saved by the little girl. The girl introduces herself, calling herself Karen. Karen tries to force Cassie to reveal her true identity. Cassie laughs and pretends the girl is mistaken. Soon it is apparent that the girl is a Controller, Aftran 942, watching her own father, the president of UniBank. It also becomes apparent that Cassie had killed Aftran's brother Estril 731. They are both lost in the forest, and Cassie knows that a leopard that escaped from a private zoo is lurking about. During their time together, Cassie is forced to reveal her identity when she fends off an attack by the leopard by morphing wolf.

Cassie begins to discuss the morality of enslaving another creature, while Aftran defends a Yeerk's right to experience life as a human or an Andalite does. Cassie tries to turn Aftran against her own people. Aftran tells Cassie that to preserve the freedom of one species, she must surrender her own freedom. Aftran presents Cassie with the following scenario: if she were Aftran, would she stay in the Yeerk Pool forever? Cassie is uncertain. She allows Aftran to enter her brain, thus freeing Karen - and putting the life of the planet at stake. Cassie convinces Aftran that what the Yeerks are doing is wrong. In return, however, Aftran compels Cassie to morph into a caterpillar and to live life as a helpless worm, as she is essentially asking Aftran to do. Cassie reluctantly agrees, and morphs, staying beyond the two-hour limit.

Jake and the others soon find Aftran back in Karen's body, and Cassie now a caterpillar. The Animorphs are enraged and more than willing to kill Karen/Aftran in revenge for Cassie, and to keep their identities a secret. After stopping the escaped leopard - Marco throwing it to the side in gorilla morph, Jake hears her out, though, and lets her live. The Animorphs take Cassie back to civilization, and Controllers using park rangers and state police as hosts rescue Karen. Cassie spins a cocoon, and stays dormant for a couple of days. Cassie emerges as a butterfly, and the Animorphs are overjoyed, but saddened, as well, certain that Cassie would spend the rest of her brief life as an insect. Ax is puzzled at how Cassie could turn into a butterfly. One of the Animorphs explains the process of metamorphosis. Ax then theorizes that the morphing clock has essentially been reset by this and she would be able to demorph, which she eventually does after the other team members chase her down. Again human, Cassie is willing to be an Animorph once more. Aftran keeps her promise, frees Karen, and establishes the Yeerk Peace Movement; Karen compels her father to fund Cassie's father's wildlife clinic, in part thanks to Cassie being a brief town celebrity for surviving in the wilderness.

Morphs

At the beginning of the story, the Animorphs use "various morphs" to spy upon a meeting of The Sharing.

Departure, The
1998 American novels
1998 science fiction novels
Novels with multiple narrators